Mambong was a federal constituency in Sarawak, Malaysia, that was represented in the Dewan Rakyat from 1999 to 2018.

The federal constituency was created in the 1996 redistribution and was mandated to return a single member to the Dewan Rakyat under the first past the post voting system.

History
It was abolished in 2016 when it was redistributed

Representation history

State constituency

Election results

References

Defunct Sarawak federal constituencies